Captiva Pass is the strait that separates North Captiva Island from La Costa Island in Lee County, Florida.

The pass connects the Gulf of Mexico to the west with Pine Island Sound to the east.

Landforms of Lee County, Florida
Straits of Florida